Baoshuigang station, is an interchange station between Line 4 and Line 9 of Chongqing Rail Transit in Chongqing municipality, China. It is located in Jiangbei District and opened in 2018. A cross-platform interchange is provided between Line 4 and Line 9.

Station structure
There are 2 island platforms at this station. The two outer tracks are used for Line 4 trains, while the other two inner tracks are used for Line 9 trains. A same direction cross-platform interchange is provided between the two metro lines.

References

Railway stations in Chongqing
Railway stations in China opened in 2018
Chongqing Rail Transit stations